This is a list of beaches in Spain sorted by province. The most popular with visitors are in Andalusia, Costa Blanca, and Catalonia.

Andalusia

Almería 
 Villaricos
 Las Negras
 San José

Cádiz 
 Sanlúcar de Barrameda
 Bonanza beach
 Bajo de Guía beach
 La Calzada/Piletas beach
 La Jara beach
 Chipiona
 Montijo beach
 Cruz del Mar beach
 Las Canteeras beach
 La Regla beach
 Camarón/Tres piedras beach

 El Puerto de Santa María
 Fuentebravía beach
 Santa Catalina beach
 El Buzo beach
 La Calita/Caletha del agua beach
 La Puntilla beach
 Valdelagrana beach
 Levante/Los Toruños beach
 Rota
 La Ballena beach
 Aguadulce/Peginas beach
 Punta Candor beach
 Piedras Gordas beach
 La Costilla beach
 El Rompidillo beach
 Puerto Real
 La Cachucha beach
 Río San Pedro beach

 Cádiz
 La Caleta beach
 Santa María del Mar beach
 La Victoria beach
 Cortadura beach
 El Chato/Torregorda beach
 La Anegada beach
 San Fernando
 Camposoto beach
 El Castillo beach
 Chiclana de la Frontera
 Lavaculos/Sancti-Petri beach
 Punta de Piedras beach
 La Barrosa beach
 El Puerco beach
 Conil de la Frontera
 Roche beach
 Calas de Poniente beach
 Cala del Aceite beach
 Calas de Quinto y Camacho beach
 Fuente del Gallo beach
 La Fontanilla beach
 Los Bateles beach
 Castilnovo beach
 Vejer de la Frontera
 El Palmar beach
 Barbate
 Zahora beach
 Calños de Meca/Cabo de Trafalgar beach
 Hierbabuena beach
 El Carmen beach
 Cañillos/Pajares beach
 Zahara de los Atunes beach
 Tarifa
 Atlanterra/Zahara de los Atunes beach
 Los Alemanes beach
 El Cañuelo beach
 Bolonia beach
 Valdevaqueros beach
 Playa de Los Lances (North and South sections)
 Chica beach
 Algeciras
 Cala Arenas
 Getares/San García beach
 El Rinconcillo beach
 Los Barrios
 Palmones beach
 La Línea de la Concepción
 Poniente beach
 Levante/Santa Barbara beach
 La Atunara/De Levante beach
 El Burgo/Torrenueva beach
 La Hacienda beach
 La Alcaidesa beach
 San Roque
 Guadarranque beach
 Campamento/Puente Mayorga beach
 Torrecarbonera beach
 Guadalquitón beach
 Sotogrande beach
 Torreguadiaro beach
 El Cabrero/Cala Taraje beach

Granada

Huelva 

La antilla
İslantilla
İsla cristina

Málaga

Costa del Sol
Nerja
Playa de Carabeo
Rincón de la Victoria
Torremolinos
Torrox
Playa de Ferrara
Vélez-Málaga
Playa de Almayate
Playa de Benajarafe
Playa de Caleta
Playa de Chilches
Playa de Lagos
Playa de Torre del Mar
Playa del Hornillo

Asturias 

Avilés
San Juan de Nieva
Carreño
Xivares
Castrillón
Salinas
Colunga
La Griega
Cudillero
El Silencio
Gijón
San Lorenzo
Poniente
Gozón 
Santa María de Luanco
Xagó
Verdicio
Bañugues
Llanes
Toró
Buelna
San Antolín
Poo
Barro
Gulpiyuri
Torimbia
Cuevas del Mar

Muros del Nalón
Aguilar
Tapia de Casariego
Peñarronda 
Valdés
Playas de Luarca
Santa Ana
Cadavedo
Villaviciosa
Rodiles
La Ñora

Basque Country

Baleares 
Platja de Palma
Es Trenc

Cantabria 
 Arnía
 Sardinero
 Magdalena

Catalonia

Costa Brava
 Nova Icària Beach
 mugala beach
 Bogatell Beach
 Mar Bella Beach
 Nova Mar Bella Beach
 Santa Sussana Beach
 Lloret Beach
 Fenals Beach
 Aiguafreda Beach
 Pals Beach

Canary Islands

Tenerife
Playa de Las Teresitas

Fuerteventura
Corralejo
Morro Jable

Galicia 

 Porto Do Son
 Arnela
 Area Longa
 O Dique
 A Hierra
 Sieras
 Nadela

Murcia

Valencia 
Alicante
Agua Amarga
Almadraba
Cabo de la Huerta
Cala Cantalar 
Cala Sangueta
La Albufereta
Postiguet
Saladares
San Gabriel
San Juan
Tabarca Island 

Altea
Bareta-Mascarat
Barra Grande
Cap Blanch 
Cap Negret
La Roda
L’Espigó
La Roda
L’Espigó
L’Olla
Raco de Corb
Galera-Solsida

Benidorm
Almadrava
Levante
Mal Pas
Poniente 
Tio Ximo
Benidorm Island 

Benissa
Bassetes Bay
Cala Fustera
El Baladrar
Els Pinets
La Llobella 
L’Advocat

Benitatxell
Cala Moraig 
Llebeig
Testos 

Calp (Calpe)
Arenal Bol
Cala Mallorqui
Cala Manzanera
Cala Morello
Calalga
Cantal Roig
Del Penyal
El Collao
El Racó
Gasparet
La Fossa – Levante
Les Bassetes 
Les Urques 
Puerto Blanco

Dénia
Albaranes
Almadrava
Arenetes
El Trampolí 
Els Molins
La Cala
Les Bovetes
Les Deveses
Les Marines
Marineta Casiana
Punta Negra 
Punta Raset

El Campello
Barranc d’Aigües 
Cala Baeza
Cala Carritxal
Cala d’Enmig
Cala Lanuza
Cala Nostra
Cala Piteres
Carrer de la Mar
Illeta dels Banyets
L’Almadrava
L’Almerador
Les Palmeretes
Lloma de Reixes
Llop Marí
Morro Blanc
Muchavista 
Punta del Riu

Elx (Elche)
Arenales del Sol
Carabassí
El Altet
El Pinet 
La Marina
Les Pesqueres-Rebollo 

Finestrat
La Cala 

Guardamar Del Segura
Babilònia
El Camp
El Moncaio 
Els Tossals
Els Vivers
Guardamar Centre
La Roqueta
Les Ortigues 

L'Alfás Del Pí
Cala Amerador
Cala de la Mina
Cala Metge
Racó de l’Albir

La Vila Joiosa (Villajoyosa)
Bol Nou 
Cala Fonda
Carritxal
El Torres
Estudiants
La Caleta
L’Esparrelló
Paradís
Puntes del Morro
Racó del Conill
Tio Roig
Varadero 
Vila Joiosa Centre
Xarco 

Orihuela Costa
Aguamarina
Barranco Rubio
Cabo Roig -Cala Capitán
Cabo Roig -La Caleta
Calas Cabo Peñas
Campoamor -La Glea
La Zenia -Cala Bosque
La Zenia -Cala Cerrada
Mil Palmeras
Playa Flamenca -Cala Estaca 
Playa Flamenca -Cala Mosca 
Punta Prima 

Pilar de la Horadada
El Conde
El Mojón
El Puerto
El Río
Las Higuericas
Las Villas
Los Jesuitas
Mil Palmeras
Rocamar Coves 
Vistamar 

Santa Pola
Bancal de L’Arena
Bernabeu Coves
Calas del Este
Caleta Gossets
Cuartel Coves
Gran Playa
La Ermita
La Gola 
L’Aljub Coves
Llevant
Playa Lisa
Tamarit
Varadero

Teulada-Moraira
Cala Blanc 
El Portet
L´Ampolla
L´Andragó
Les Platgetes 
Portitxolet

Torrevieja
Acequion
Cabo Cervera
Cala Ferris
Cala Piteras 
Cala Rocío de Mar 
El Cura
La Mata
Las Calas
Las Piscinas
Los Locos
Los Náufragos

Valencia
:

Playa de l'Arbre del Gos

Xàbia (Jávea)
Ambolo
Barraca (Portitxol) 
Benissero
Cala Blanca
Cala Granadella 
Cala Sardinera
El Arenal
La Grava
Muntanyar

See also

List of beaches in Menorca
List of beaches

References 
 Guide to Alicante beaches 
 Beaches guide 

 
Atlantic Ocean-related lists